Towanoyama Yoshimitsu (born July 10, 1977 as Akihito Kobayashi) is a former sumo wrestler from Toshima, Tokyo, Japan. He made his professional debut in 1993. His highest rank was maegashira 13, achieved in March 2002. He had many injury problems and had perhaps the unluckiest (and shortest) top makuuchi division career of any wrestler in sumo, being injured before even fighting a match in the division. He is the only wrestler since the beginning of the Shōwa era in 1926 to have been ranked in the top division without winning any bouts there.

Career
Towanoyama made his professional debut in November 1993, joining Dewanoumi stable straight from high school. At the time Dewanoumi stable was extremely strong and he had many powerful training partners. He served as a personal attendant to such top division men as Kushimaumi, Oginohana and Oginishiki. In March 1999 he won the makushita division championship with a perfect 7-0 record and earned promotion to the second highest jūryō division, becoming an elite sekitori wrestler. He suffered an injury to his right ankle which required surgery and affected his performances, resulting in demotion back to makushita after only four tournaments. However, in May 2001 he won his second makushita championship and returned to the second division. A strong 11-4 record in January 2002 earned him promotion to the top makuuchi division, alongside Shimotori.

He was the highest ranked wrestler in his stable and was able to use his immense weight to good advantage. However, on the day of his first match in the top division in March 2002, he injured his knee in training and was forced to pull out of the tournament without participating in a single bout. This was to prove to be his only top division tournament. After winning only five bouts in the next tournament he fell to makushita once again. He was able to return to the jūryō division in November 2003, but on the tenth day of the March 2004 tournament, whilst trying to force a throwing move against Wakakosho, he fell badly and tore his patella tendon. He was hospitalised for four months, requiring transplant surgery for thigh tendons. He missed five consecutive tournaments, which meant he fell greatly in rank, ending up in the second lowest jonidan division.

After rehabilitation and weight training programs Towanoyama returned to the ring in March 2005 and made his way slowly back up the rankings, but never managed to regain sekitori status. A 6-1 score in May 2008 moved him up to Makushita 6 for July, his highest ranking since his 2004 injury. He produced a 5-2 score there, putting him on the brink of promotion back to jūryō, and he was even called up to face a jūryō opponent, Kaiho, in the following tournament - his first match against a sekitori in 27 basho. However, after two losing scores he slid down the makushita division again. In 2009 he rebounded again with three consecutive winning records.  His results slowly begin to slip however, and over a four-year period he slowly dropped in the ranks of makushita being relegated to the lower sandanme division in May 2013, but achieving a winning record in that tournament and the next to gain promotion back to his mainstay of makushita. He announced his retirement after the January 2015 tournament, where he achieved his 500th career win but lost his six other bouts. He was the first wrestler to be ranked in the top division but not have any makuuchi wins since Kenrokuzan missed his only top division tournament in May 1926, before the Shōwa era.

Fighting style
Towanoyama was a yotsu-sumo specialist, preferring grappling techniques to pushing or thrusting. His favoured grip on his opponent's mawashi is migi-yotsu, a left hand outside, right hand inside position. His most common winning kimarite was yori-kiri, a straightforward force out, which accounts for about 45 percent of his career victories.

Career record

See also
Glossary of sumo terms
List of past sumo wrestlers

References

External links
 

1977 births
Living people
Japanese sumo wrestlers
Sumo people from Tokyo